The anthem of Transnistria, titled "We Sing the Praises of Transnistria", was written by Boris Parmenov, Nicholas Bozhko and Vitaly Pishchenko, and composed by Boris Alexandrovich Alexandrov. The anthem has lyrics in all three official languages of Transnistria: Russian, Romanian, and Ukrainian. They are, however, not all literal translations of one another. The origin of the anthem was from the Russian patriotic song "Long Live our State" (""), a 1943 composition that was one of the proposed songs to be the anthem of the Soviet Union. Boris Alexandrov's composition was, however, rejected in favor of the one submitted by his father, Alexander Alexandrov.

Anthem law 
The national anthem of Transnistria is a piece of music created with the music of Boris Alexandrovich Alexandrov, and the words of Boris Parmenov, Nicholas Bozhko and Vitaly Pishchenko.

The national anthem of Transnistria must be performed in strict accordance with the approved musical version and text; other musical editions and translations of it are not considered to be the national anthem of Transnistria.

The national anthem must be played:

 after the President of the Transnistria takes the oath of office;
 at the opening of the first meeting after the recess and the closing of the last meeting of each session of the Supreme Council;
 during the official flag lifting ceremony;
 every day at the beginning and at the end of the broadcast of television and radio programs on state television and radio;
 during the meeting and sending-off ceremony of persons (delegations) of foreign states visiting the state authorities of Transnistria on an official visit. The national anthem of the Transnistria is performed after the anthem of the corresponding state is performed.

The national anthem of Transnistria may be performed:

 during the opening and closing of solemn meetings dedicated to holidays and significant dates of the republic;
 during the opening of monuments and memorials of national significance;
 during other solemn and protocol events held by state and administrative bodies, local self-government, enterprises, institutions, organizations and individuals.

The anthem of Transnistria may be sung during state sports competitions.

During the public performance of the anthem, those present listen to it standing up, and men take off their hats, and if the flag of Transnistria is rising as the same time, then anybody present has to turn to face the flag.

It is allowed to use variants of the musical presentation of the anthem in different instrumentation and arrangements.

The national anthem of Transnistria is broadcast by the state audio and audiovisual mass media, the founders of which are the president of the republic and the Supreme Council:

 daily – before the start and after the end of broadcasting, and with round–the-clock broadcasting - at 6 o'clock and at 24 o'clock;
 on New Year's Eve – after the broadcast of the battle of the clock at 24 o'clock.

The anthem can be sung in Romanian, Russian or Ukrainian.

Lyrics

Romanian

Russian

Ukrainian

Translations into English
Since Transnistria has three official languages, the anthem has official lyrics in Romanian, Russian and Ukrainian; however, they are not all literal translations of one another and all have different semantic meanings. The translations are represented below:

Trilingual version

On official TV broadcasts, a trilingual version is used consisting of the first verse and chorus in Russian, the second verse and chorus in Romanian, the first verse and chorus in Ukrainian and the final repeat of the chorus in Russian.

Notes

References

External links
 State symbols of the PMR .
 Law of the Anthem of the PMR (In Russian)

National anthems of the Commonwealth of Unrecognized States
Transnistria
Politics of Transnistria
National anthem compositions in F major